William Henry Ridley (2 April 1816 – 17 February 1882) was a priest in the Church of England and an author.

Life
Ridley, born on 2 April 1816, was eldest son of Henry Colborne Ridley (1780–1832), rector of Hambleden, near Henley-on-Thames, a descendant of the Ridleys of Willimoteswick. His mother was Mary, daughter of James Ferrier of Lincoln's Inn Fields. He matriculated from Christ Church, Oxford, on 15 May 1834, was a student 1836–41, and graduated B.A. in 1838, and M.A. in 1840.

He succeeded to the family living of Hambleden on 25 July 1840, and continued there until his death. In 1859 he became rural dean of Wycombe, and in 1871 an honorary canon of Christ Church, Oxford.

He died at Brighton on 17 February 1882, having married, on 25 August 1841, Sophia Albertina, second daughter of Charles Richard Sumner, bishop of Winchester; by her, who died on 1 July 1884, he had an only son, Henry Colborne Mannoir Ridley.

Publications
Ridley was a voluminous writer of theological literature, but many of his publications are only single sermons and tracts. The latter include two ‘Plain Tracts on Confirmation’ (1844 and 1862), which had a wide circulation. His chief works are:
The Holy Communion, parts i. and ii. 1854; 3rd edit. 1860.
What can we do for our Soldiers in the East? 1854.
Clerical Incomes and Clerical Taxation; Dr. Phillimore's Bill for the Assessment of Tithe Commutation Rent Charges, 1856.
What can we do for our Fellow Subjects in India? 1857.

References

Attribution

English Anglicans
1816 births
1882 deaths
People from Henley-on-Thames
William
Presidents of the Oxford Union